Tulika Mehrotra is a technology executive and author.

Biography 

Tulika Mehrotra is based in Chicago. She was born in Lucknow and is fluent in Hindi. Currently, she is the Chief Digital Officer of Peterson Technology Partners.

She received her bachelor's degree in finance from the University of Illinois at Urbana–Champaign During her undergraduate studies, she studied abroad at the University of Reading at the ICMA Business School in England.

For graduate studies, she attended the European Institute of Design in Milan, Italy where she received her master's degree in Fashion Design. After completing her degree, she lived in Paris where she briefly studied French.

After a corporate career that began in the fashion industry in New York and transitioned to media in Los Angeles, Tulika focused her attention on writing. Her first two novels were published by Penguin Publishers.

Tulika has also written for various magazines including Harper's Bazaar, Elle, Vogue, Grazia, India Today and Men's Health. Tulika is an expert in storytelling for business, digital strategy and communications.

Books

Delhi Stopover and Crashing B-Town 

Her debut novel Delhi Stopover was launched in October 2012 in Mumbai. The sequel, Crashing B-Town was released the following year. Both titles became best sellers in India.

The novels explore the cultural changes in modern India and within the youth generation using a backdrop of the fashion and film industries in Delhi and Mumbai.

References

External links 
 Personal website
 Tulika Mehrotra on Facebook

Year of birth missing (living people)
Living people
American novelists of Indian descent
American women novelists
American women writers of Indian descent
American women journalists
American writers of Indian descent
21st-century American novelists
Writers from Chicago
Gies College of Business alumni
21st-century American women writers
Writers from Lucknow
Novelists from Illinois
21st-century American non-fiction writers
People from Chicago